Tetrabutylammonium hydroxide is the chemical compound with the formula (C4H9)4NOH, abbreviated Bu4NOH with the acronym TBAOH or TBAH. This species is employed as a solution in water or alcohols. It is a common base in organic chemistry. Relative to more conventional inorganic bases, such as KOH and NaOH, Bu4NOH is more soluble in organic solvents.

Preparation and reactions
Solutions of Bu4NOH are usually prepared in situ from butylammonium halides, Bu4NX, for example by reacting them with silver oxide or using an ion exchange resin. Attempts to isolate Bu4NOH induces Hofmann elimination, leading to Bu3N and 1-butene. Solutions of Bu4NOH are typically contaminated with Bu3N for this reason.

Treatment of Bu4NOH with a wide range of acids gives water and the other tetrabutylammonium salts:  Bu4NOH + HX -> Bu4NX + H2O

Applications
Bu4NOH is a strong base that is used often under phase-transfer conditions to effect alkylations and deprotonations. Typical reactions include benzylation of amines and generation of dichlorocarbene from chloroform.

Bu4NOH can be neutralized with a variety of mineral acids to give lipophilic salts of the conjugate base. For example, treatment of Bu4NOH with disodium pyrophosphate, Na2H2P2O7, gives (Bu4N)3[HP2O7], which is soluble in organic solvents. Similarly, neutralization of Bu4NOH with hydrofluoric acid affords an relatively water-free Bu4NF. This salt dissolves in organic solvents and is useful to desilylation.

References

Tetrabutylammonium salts
Hydroxides